Henry Hare (1861–1921) was an English architect.

Henry Hare may also refer to:

Henry Hare, 3rd Baron Coleraine (1693–1749), English antiquary
Henry Hare, 2nd Baron Coleraine (1636–1708), English politician and antiquary

See also